The Cromlech of the Almendres is a megalithic complex (commonly known as the Almendres Cromlech), located 4.5 road km WSW of the village of Nossa Senhora de Guadalupe, in the civil parish of Nossa Senhora da Tourega e Nossa Senhora de Guadalupe, municipality of Évora, in the Portuguese Alentejo. The largest existing group of structured menhirs in the Iberian Peninsula (and one of the largest in Europe), this archaeological site consists of several megalithic structures: cromlechs and menhir stones, that belong to the so-called "megalithic universe of Évora", with clear parallels to other cromlechs in Évora District, such as Portela Mogos and the Vale Maria do Meio Cromlech.

History

The construction of these structures dates back to the 6th millennium BC. They were rediscovered in 1966 by Henrique Leonor Pina, who was carrying out field work relating to the country's geological charts.

The excavation of the site unearthed a series of both megalithic and neolithic construction phases; Almendres I  6000 BC (Early Neolithic), Almendres II 5000 BC (Middle Neolithic), and Almendres III 4000 BC (Late Neolithic). The relative chronology of the cromlech and menhirs is extremely complex and covers a period from the Neolithic  to Chalcolithic. It is believed that the monument either had a religious/ceremonial purpose or functioned as a primitive astronomical observatory.

Architecture
Located off the national roadway from Évora to Montemor-o-Novo, in the former-civil parish of Nossa Senhora de Guadalupe, the cromlech is situated just after the village of Guadalupe, in Herdade dos Almendres (the Almendres Estate). It is located in the southwest of the property, while the menhir is situated on the eastern limits of the estate facing the sunrise  over the Serra de Monfurado, isolated from the local community. A pedestrian trail was defined by the local municipal council, and integrated into the municipality's "megalithic route" that follows the prehistoric remnants through the region.

The complex, organized in a circular pattern, is marked by a forest of about 95 granite monoliths, deposited in small groups. The older (Early Neolithic) monoliths are formed as two or three concentric circles of smaller monoliths in the western part of the complex, while the Middle Neolithic structures consist of two ellipses (irregular but concentric) and large menhirs. In the Late Neolithic phase the earlier constructions suffered modifications, transforming it into a site for social or religious rituals. Ninety-two of the menhirs form two grounds, which were built and oriented to different directions associated with the Equinox.

Many of the stones were unearthed where they stood/fell, and were rebuilt/erected by Mario Varela Gomes, based on criteria established from research and rediscovery of the original bases.  The complex's latitudinal position is about the same as the maximum moon elongation (38.55 degrees for 1500 BC); comparably, another latitude where this occurs is associated with Stonehenge (51.18 degrees for 2000 BC).

Although there are many large solitary 2.5 to 3.5 metres rounded/elliptical stones, most are smaller and formed into groups. The cromlech occupies an area of 70 by 40 metres, oriented along an axial alignment northwest to southeast. The columns show signs of profound erosion, especially in those surfaces exposed to the elements, although decoration is still visible. These designs take the form of lines and radials, at least two on each stone.

About a dozen monoliths exhibit some form of carved drawings,  of which four exhibit only small circular holes. Monolith number 8, with a cut flat top at about breast level and showing several dimples, might have served for finer astronomical observation, specially spring equinox observation, by putting small stones on the dimples. These observations might also be made from stone 39, on the eastern focal point of the elliptic layout. Menhir 48, also exhibits a schematized anthropomorphic representation, surrounded by circles and associated with a crozier.

An isolated single menhir, approximately 4.5 metres tall and 0.9 metres in diameter is located near the residences, or 1400 metres northeast of the main complex. A line from the Almendres Cromlech to this menhir points roughly towards the sunrise in the Winter solstice.

Views

Gallery

References

Notes

Sources

External links 
 Câmara Municipal de Évora Archaeology site
 The Megalithic Portal: Cromlech of the Almendres 
  The Megalithic Portal: Menhir of the Almendres
  360° Photos
 Megalithomania
 GEMA - Grupo de Estudos do Megalitismo Alentejano (Alentejo Megalithic Study Group)
 Photos of the Almendres Cromlech

National monuments in Évora District
Megalithic monuments in Portugal
Prehistoric sites in Portugal
Buildings and structures in Évora
Stone Age Europe
Prehistoric art
Tourist attractions in Évora District